"You Are the One," written by D. Gaskins and K. Lowery, was a single from the soundtrack to the 1989 film Lean on Me. The following year, it was included on their second album Louder Than Love.

Track listing
US 12" single

US Maxi Single

Charts

References

1989 singles
TKA songs
1989 songs
Tommy Boy Records singles